Prohibition refers to the act of prohibiting a certain substance or act.

Prohibition may also refer to:
 Prohibition of alcohol, periods in several countries during which the manufacture, transportation, import, export, and sale of alcoholic beverages was or is restricted or illegal
 Prohibitionism in Christianity
 Prohibition in the United States
 Prohibition in Canada
 Prohibition of drugs
 War on Drugs, an American term commonly applied to a campaign of prohibition of drugs, military aid, and military intervention, with the stated aim being to reduce the illegal drug trade
 Prohibitionism in legal philosophy
 Prohibition sign ("no" symbol), a red circle with a diagonal line through it (running from top left to bottom right), covering a pictogram to indicate something is not permitted
 Prohibition (miniseries), a Ken Burns documentary on the American temperance movement and prohibition
 Writ of prohibition, in the United States, an official legal document drafted and issued by a supreme court or superior court to a judge presiding over a suit in an inferior court; the writ of prohibition mandates the inferior court to cease any action over the case because it may not fall within that inferior court's jurisdiction
 In the Quran, sura 66, At-Tahrim, is generally translated as "Prohibition"
 Prohibition (album), an album by French avant-garde singer Brigitte Fontaine